Air Force The Movie: Selagi Bernyawa is a 2022 Malaysian military action film co-directed by Zulkarnain Azhar and Frank See.

Plot 
The movie follows the story of a PASKAU team led by Captain Adib (Nas-T) and his mentor, Major Adnan (Dato Adi Putra), tasked with protecting humanitarians serving in the fictional war torn island nation of Namburi. On their return home, their plane is unexpectedly shot down by local militants. Nine of the passengers manage to jump before the plane crashes. Back in Malaysia, upon discovery of this news, the air force make preparations for rescue. Adib's brother in-law, Zafran (Aiman Hakim Ridza), a grounded Sukhoi Su-30 pilot, fights for the opportunity to save them. The air force deploys help and the survivors make their final run to salvation.

Cast
Sangeeta Krishnasamy as Lieutenant Layla TUDM, assistant Brig General Dato Rahim
Aiman Hakim Ridza as Major Zafran 'Mantis' Abd Rahman TUDM, pilot Sukhoi Su-30, brother Hana and brother in-law Capt Adib 'Rock' PASKAU
Nas-T as Captain Mohd Adib 'Rock' Hasyim TUDM, young officer PASKAU & brother in law Major Zafran
Dato Adi Putra as Major Adnan Zaid 'Lejen' Rahmat TUDM as commander officer mission Namburi 
Luqman Hafidz as Leading Aircraft Azran 'Gaban' Ahmad TUDM, marksman team Major Adnan
Johan As'ari as Corperal Fakrul Razi 'Paco' Zain TUDM, medic team Major Adnan who suffer post-traumatic stress disorder
Pablo Amirul as Sergeant Barat'Tuai' Aripin TUDM, tracker team Major Adnan
Jack Tan as Sergeant Anthony Gabriel 'Hujan' Lin, radioman team Major Adnan
Scha Alyahya as Captain Nur Liyana TUDM, pilot Airbus A400M Atlas
Fezrul Khan as Major Syed Yazid TUDM, co-pilot Airbus A400M Atlas 
Sara Ali as Natrah Hamzah, journalist documentary Era TV
Anas Ridzuan as Mohd Nor @ Matno, cameraman Natrah
Iman Corrine as Dr.Susan Livistone, surgeon humanitarian mission in Namburi
Azira Shafinaz as Hana, sister Major Zafran & wife Capt Mohd Adib
Esma Daniel as Brig General Dato Rahim Mohamad TUDM, division commander & in charge Operation Hornbill
Hafizuddin Fazil as Lieutenant General Dato Norman, Chief of Air Force 
Aqasha as Lieutenant Colonel Ramli Hassan, commanding officer Sukhoi Squadron
Niezam Zaidi as Lieutenant Saifullah 'Cypher', rival Major Zafran
Adam Shah as Lieutenant Hisham, friend Lieutenant Saifullah
Saidi Sabri as Major Suhami 'Spoon', friend Major Zafran & assistant weapon Sukhoi
Carmen Soo as Captain Marya Lee, engineering officer who charge case Major Zafran
Seelan as Flight Sergeant Vibesh, crew A400M Airbus 
Idzham Ismail as Corperal Isma Ali Ismail, crew A400M Airbus (uncredited)
Fauzi Nawawi as drill instructor cadets officer training (uncredited)

Production 
Air Force The Movie: Selagi Bernyawa is produced in collaboration with the Royal Malaysian Air Force, Malaysian Armed Forces and five major companies; Multimedia Entertainment, Golden Screen Cinemas (GSC), Astro, FXHammer Films and SixFun Media.

It was directed by Zulkarnain Azhar, who had previously directed J Revolusi, and Frank See, who had written the script for PASKAL: The Movie. Zulkarnain said: "It is difficult with the Movement Control Order implemented, but I am happy because we worked hard together as a team and completed it without any difficulties," according to him, the actors underwent basic military training at PASKAU Jugra in Banting, Selangor for a month.

Filming 
Filming took place from October 2019 to December 2019. There was additional filming for the flight and air combat scenes between January and February 2020 with the help of the RMAF. The post-production process stopped following the implementation of the Movement Control Order (MCO) in March 2020 due to the spread of the COVID-19 pandemic in Malaysia. Filming locations include Kuantan, Pahang, Kuala Terengganu, Terengganu, Shah Alam, Selangor, Alor Star, Kedah, Kota Belud and Sabah.

Soundtrack
The film soundtrack, entitled Selagi Bernyawa was performed by The Penthemix and written and composed by Pown Hasril, Amir Masdi, Nass and released on 1 August 2022. There are original and acoustic versions of the music video on YouTube.

Release 
The official trailer for Air Force The Movie: Selagi Bernyawa was released on Golden Screen Cinemas' official YouTube channel on June 2, 2022. The film's launch ceremony was officiated by the Chief of the Armed Forces, General Tan Sri Affendi Buang in a ceremony at Subang Air Base on the same day.

The film was originally scheduled for release in August 2021, but was postponed due to unknown reasons. It has been announced that the film will be released in cinemas nationwide on August 25, 2022.

The premiere ceremony of this film was held on August 22, 2022 at GSC Mid Valley and was attended by 2,000 guests including RMAF and RMN officials as well as the cast of the film.

Golden Screen Cinemas also planned to distribute the movie to Japan, South Korea and Taiwan.

Reception

Box office 
Air Force The Movie: Selagi Bernyawa earned a total of RM6-8 million at the box office within 3–4 days of its official premiere. Currently, the movie has earned a total of RM13 million at the box office, before the planned distribution of the film in Japan, South Korea and Taiwan.

References

External links 
 

2022 films
Malaysian action films